Archie is an H chondrite meteorite that fell to earth on August 10, 1932, in Archie, Missouri.

Classification
It is an ordinary chondrite type H with a petrologic type 6, thus belongs to the group H6.

References

The meteorite fall of August 10, 1932

See also 
 Glossary of meteoritics
 Meteorite falls
 Ordinary chondrite

Meteorites found in the United States
Geology of Missouri
1932 in Missouri